James Morton Smith (May 28, 1919 – March 19, 2012) was an American historian and educator who served as director of the Wisconsin Historical Society from 1970–1976 and director of Winterthur Museum, Garden and Library from 1976–1984. He received a Guggenheim Fellowship and a fellowship from the American Council of Learned Societies, both in 1960.

Life and career 
Born in Bernie, Missouri, Smith served in the United States Coast Guard during World War II and earned his BA from Southern Illinois University in 1941, his MA from the University of Oklahoma in 1942, and PhD in US history and constitutional law from Cornell University in 1951. He taught US history at Butler University, Ohio State University, Duke University, College of William & Mary, and Cornell University in addition to his director roles at the Wisconsin Historical Society and Winterthur Museum. He authored seven scholarly books, including a seminal three-volume collection of the correspondence of Thomas Jefferson and James Madison in 1995, and also edited publications at Omohundro Institute of Early American History and Culture. 

Smith married Kathryn E. Hegler in 1945 and had two children, James and Melissa. He died after a long illness at his home in Elkon, Maryland, at the age of 92.

Publications

References 

1919 births
2012 deaths
People from Stoddard County, Missouri
Southern Illinois University alumni
University of Oklahoma alumni
Cornell University alumni
20th-century American historians
American male non-fiction writers
Historians of the United States
Political historians
20th-century American male writers
People associated with Winterthur Museum, Garden and Library
Wisconsin Historical Society
United States Coast Guard personnel of World War II
Directors of museums in the United States